HKA may refer to:
 HKA test, of molecular evolution
 Blytheville Municipal Airport, in Arkansas, US
 Henryka Beyer (1782–1855), German painter
 Hong Kong Academy
 Hong Kong Attitude, an esports organization
 Hong Kong Airlines, founded 2006
 Hong Kong Airways, active 1947–1959
 Kahe language
 Superior Aviation, an American airline